Lalewal is a village in Shaheed Bhagat Singh Nagar district of Punjab State, India. The village is administrated by Sarpanch an elected representative of the village.

Demography 
As of 2011, Lalewal has a total number of 29 houses and population of 139 of which 69 include are males while 70 are females according to the report published by Census India in 2011. The literacy rate of Lalewal is 55.56%, lower than the state average of 75.84%. The population of children under the age of 6 years is 22 which is 15.83% of total population of Lalewal, and child sex ratio is approximately 1750 as compared to Punjab state average of 846.

Most of the people are from Schedule Caste which constitutes 54.68% of total population in Lalewal. The town does not have any Schedule Tribe population so far.

As per the report published by Census India in 2011, 28 people were engaged in work activities out of the total population of Lalewal which includes 27 males and 1 females. According to census survey report 2011, 96.43% workers describe their work as main work and 3.57% workers are involved in Marginal activity providing livelihood for less than 6 months.

Education 
KC Engineering College and Doaba Khalsa Trust Group Of Institutions are the nearest colleges.

List of schools nearby:
Dashmesh Model School, Kahma
Govt Primary School, Kahlon
Govt High School, Garcha

Transport 

See also 
List of villages in India

References

External links 
 Tourism of Punjab
 Census of Punjab
 Locality Based PINCode

Villages in Shaheed Bhagat Singh Nagar district